New Addictions is the fourth and final EP by American pop rock band R5. It was released on May 12, 2017 through Hollywood Records.

Background
The band announced the release of the EP on April 5, 2017 via Twitter along a two-date pre-release show on April 27, 2017 at Los Angeles and May 11, 2017 on New York City respectively. The album was almost entirely produced by band member Rocky Lynch.

Promotion
The band announced the New Addictions Tour to promote the EP, with the first leg set to start on June 24, 2017 in Denver, Colorado. The same day the EP was released, a music video for the song "If", directed by Michel Borden, was released via Vevo. It was filmed in San Diego and inspired by the films Risky Business, Pulp Fiction, Boogie Nights, Fear and Loathing in Las Vegas and Goodfellas.

Reception
Rolling Stone called the EP "full of sharply constructed pop confections that ride galloping basslines."

Track listing 
Credits taken from Qobuz.

Notes
 signifies an additional producer

Charts

Release history

References 

R5 (band) albums
2017 EPs
Hollywood Records EPs